Nutt, Wisconsin was a hamlet along the Duluth, South Shore and Atlantic Railway in Brule township, in Douglas County, Wisconsin. There was a post office there as of 1895. In the 1898 Hand Book of Wisconsin: Its History and Geography ... and Resources, Industries, and Commerce, it is listed as having a population of 50, and is described as follows:It has a sawmill and a general store. As of 1915, the post office there had been discontinued.

References 

Ghost towns in Wisconsin
Ghost towns of Douglas County, Wisconsin